The Committee for the Five Northern Korean Provinces (literally "The North's Five Provinces Committee") is a South Korean government body under the Ministry of the Interior and Safety.

History
Established in 1949, the committee is officially responsible for the administration of the five Korean provinces located entirely north of the Military Demarcation Line, as the South Korean government formally claims to be the sole legitimate government of whole of Korea. The South Korean government does not recognise any changes to the borders of the provinces made by North Korea since its establishment. The President of South Korea appoints governors for each of the five provinces. However, their role is largely symbolic (compare with titular bishops), as the territory is under the effective jurisdiction of North Korea. The committee's main practical function is to provide support to North Korean defectors living in South Korea, including helping with the resettlement of North Koreans and organizing social events for North Koreans.

Despite its name, the committee plays no part in North Korea–South Korea relations; North Korean affairs are handled by the Ministry of Unification. In the event of a North Korean collapse, contingency plans call for a new government body to be set up to administer the North under the leadership of the Unification Minister. In that case, the five governors would have to resign and the committee would be disbanded.

Flags of the five northern Korean provinces

Historical

Southern provinces with territory in North Korea
Two South Korean provinces, Gyeonggi and Gangwon, officially have parts of their territory in North Korea. The South Korean government considers the governors of these two provinces the head of their entire province, including the parts in the North.

Gyeonggi Province - Gaeseong, Gaepung County & Jangdan County claimed
Gangwon Province - from Kangwon province - Gimhwa County, Icheon County, Tongcheon County, Pyeonggang County and Hoeyang County claimed

See also 

 Korean reunification
 Committee for the Peaceful Reunification of the Fatherland

References

External links
 Official website of The Committee for the Five Northern Korean Provinces 

North
North
Korean irredentism
Governments in exile
States and territories established in 1949